Sumbat Davitis Dze, or Sumbat, son of David, in modern English transliteration, was the 11th-century Georgian chronicler who described in his The Life and Tale of the Bagratids  the history of the Bagrationi dynasty of Georgia from the beginnings until c. 1030. The Georgian scholar Ekvtime Takaishvili has demonstrated that Sumbat belonged to that dynasty. The author is notable for his articulation of the Bagratid claim to be descended from the biblical King-Prophet David.

References

სუმბატ დავითის ძე, ცხოვრება და უწყება ბაგრატონიანთა,წგნ-ში სამი ისტორიული ხრონიკა, ე. თაყაიშვილის გამოც. თბილისი, 1920.
სუმბატ დავიტის ძის ქრონიკა ტაო-კლარჯეთის ბაგრატიონთა შესახებ, ე. თაყაისვილის გამოც. მასალები საქართველოსა და კავკასიის ისტორიისათვის, ნაკვ. 27, თბილისი, 1949.
Сумбат Давитис-дзе, Жизнь и известия о Багратидах, Три хроники. изд. Е.Такайшвили, СМОМПК, вып.XVIII, Тиф. 1900.
სუმბატ დავითის ძე, ცხორება და უწყება ბაგრატონიანთა, გ. არახამიას გამოცემა, თბილისი, 1990;
დ. კარიჭაშვილი, ვინ უნდა იყოს “სომბატის ქრონიკის” ავტორი , კრ. ძველი საქართველო, I, განყ. II, 1909.
გ.გელაშვილი, სუმბატ დავითის-ძე და “მატიანე ქართლისა”თსუ სრომები, #87, 1960.
ვ.გუჩუა, სუმბატ დავითის ძე ბაგრატიონი, ქსე, #9, 1985.
გ. მამულია, სუმბატ დავითის-ძის ერთი წყაროს საკითხისათვის, “ქართული წყაროთმცოდნეობა”, III, თბილისი, 1971.
გ. ბუაჩიძე, სუმბატ დავითის ძის თხზულებისა და “მატიანე ქართლისას” ერთი ადგილის გაგებისათვის, კრებული: საქართველოს ეკლესიის, ქართული სასულიერო მწერლობის და ქრისტიანული ხელოვნების ისტორიის საკითხები, თბილისი, 1998.
მ. სანაძე, “ქართლის ცხოვრება” და საქართველოს ისტორიის უძველესი პერიოდი (ქართლოსიდან მირიანამდე), თბილისი, 2001, გვ.159-179.
ზ. ალექსიძე, ქართლში ბაგრატიონთა დინასტიის პირველი გამოჩენა, კრ. ბაგრატიონები, თბილისი, 2003.
მ. სურგულაძე, ბაგრატიონთა წარმოშობის ბიბლიური ლეგენდა, საისტორიო ალმანახი კილო, თბილისი, 2004.

Bagrationi dynasty of Tao-Klarjeti
Chroniclers
11th-century historians from Georgia (country)